Iio Sōgi (1421–1502) was a Japanese poet.

Sogi may also refer to:

People with the surname 
 Akoya Sogi (born 1968), Japanese voice actress
 Takamasa Sogi, a fictional character in Corpse Princess

Places 
 Sogi, American Samoa, a settlement on Tutuila Island
 Sogi, Samoa, a village in Samoa

Other uses 
 SOGI, acronym for  Sexual Orientation and  Gender Identity
 sogi, a term used in Taekwondo stances
 Gold Star Sogi, an association football club in the Samoa National League